My Fever Broke is an EP by Rasputina, released in 2002 on Instinct Records. The track "The Fox in the Snow" is a Belle and Sebastian cover.

Track listing

Notes
Tracks 1 and 5 remixed by Joseph Bishara
Track 2 remixed by Dimitri Tikovoï
Tracks 3 and 7 remixed by Chris Vrenna

References

Rasputina (band) albums
2002 EPs